Anolis pentaprion, the lichen anole, is a species of lizard in the family Dactyloidae. The species is found in Nicaragua, Costa Rica, Panama, and Colombia.

References

Anoles
Reptiles of Nicaragua
Reptiles of Colombia
Reptiles of Costa Rica
Reptiles of Panama
Reptiles described in 1863
Taxa named by Edward Drinker Cope